Eik or EIK may refer to:

People 
 Arild Eik (1943–2009), Norwegian aid worker and diplomat

Places 
 Eik, Agder, a village in Kristiansand municipality in Agder county, Norway
 Eik, Rogaland, a village in Lund municipality in Rogaland county, Norway
 Eik, Vestfold, a neighborhood in Tønsberg municipality in Vestfold og Telemark county, Norway

Sport 
 Egersunds IK, a Norwegian football club
 Eik-Tønsberg, a Norwegian football club
 Enskede IK, a Swedish football club
 Esbjerg Ishockey Klub, a Danish ice hockey team
 Eslövs IK, a Swedish sports club

Other uses 
 Eik Banki, a Faroese bank
 Yeysk Airport, in Russia
 Erie Municipal Airport, in Colorado, United States